Francis George Godolphin D'Arcy D'Arcy-Osborne, 7th Duke of Leeds (21 May 1798 – 4 May 1859), styled Earl of Danby from birth until 1799 and Marquess of Carmarthen from 1799 until 1838, was a British peer and politician.

Early life
Osborne was the son of George Osborne, 6th Duke of Leeds, and his wife, Charlotte Townshend. His younger brother was Lord Conyers George Thomas William Osborne (1812–1831) and his sister was Lady Charlotte Mary Anne Georgiana Osborne (d. 1836), the wife of Sackville Lane-Fox, MP (the third son of James Fox-Lane, MP, of Bramham Park).

His mother was the eldest daughter of George Townshend, 1st Marquess Townshend and, his second wife, Anne Montgomery (a daughter of Sir William Montgomery, 1st Baronet of Magbiehill and Mistress of the Robes to Caroline, Princess of Wales). Among her extended maternal family was her uncle Captain Lord James Townshend.

Career
As Marquess of Carmarthen, he held the parliamentary seat of Helston from 1826 to 1830 and on 2 July 1838, was summoned to the House of Lords in his father's barony of Osborne. A few weeks later, he inherited his father's dukedom; and added the name of D'Arcy to his surname by Royal Licence in 1849.

Personal life
On 24 April 1828, he married Louisa Catherine Hervey-Bathurst (née Caton; 1793–1874). She was the widow of Sir Felton Hervey-Bathurst, 1st Baronet, and the third daughter and co-heiress of Richard Caton of Maryland. Louisa had three sisters, Marianne (the wife of Robert Patterson, and, after his death, Richard Wellesley, 1st Marquess Wellesley), Elizabeth (the wife of George Stafford-Jerningham, 8th Baron Stafford), and Emily (the wife of John McTavish).

The couple had no children and, upon the duke's death in 1859, his titles passed to other members of his family – the dukedom of Leeds went to his cousin, the 2nd Lord Godolphin, whereas the baronies of Darcy de Knayth and Conyers went to his nephew, Sackville Lane-Fox, along with the Portuguese countship of Mértola.

The 7th Duke of Leeds and his wife are buried in the Osborne family chapel at All Hallows Church, Harthill, South Yorkshire.

References

External links
 
 

1798 births
1859 deaths
D'Arcy-Osborne, Francis
Carmarthen, Francis Osborne, Marquess of
UK MPs who inherited peerages
Carmarthen, Francis Osborne, Marquess of
Francis07
107
Burials at Osborne family chapel, All Hallows' Church (Harthill)
Barons Darcy de Knayth
Barons Conyers